The Statistical Probability of Love at First Sight is an upcoming American romance film, directed by Vanessa Caswill, from a screenplay by Katie Lovejoy, based upon the 2011 novel of the same name by Jennifer E. Smith. It stars Haley Lu Richardson, Ben Hardy, Dexter Fletcher, Rob Delaney, Sally Phillips and Jameela Jamil.

Cast
 Haley Lu Richardson as Hadley Sullivan
 Ben Hardy as Oliver
 Dexter Fletcher as Val
 Sally Phillips as Tessa Jones
 Rob Delaney
 Jameela Jamil as Narrator
 David Rubin as Dr. Harrison Doyle
 Tom Taylor as Luther Jones

Production
In November 2020, Haley Lu Richardson joined the cast of the film, with Vanessa Caswill directing from a screenplay by Katie Lovejoy, based upon the novel of the same name by Jennifer E. Smith, with Richardson also set to serve as an executive producer. In January 2021, Ben Hardy, Dexter Fletcher, Rob Delaney, Sally Phillips and Jameela Jamil joined the cast of the film, with principal photography beginning that same month.

Release
In April 2022, Netflix bought worldwide rights to the film.

See also
 Love at first sight

References

External links
 

Upcoming films
American drama films
American romance films
Films based on American novels
Upcoming Netflix original films
Upcoming directorial debut films